Combattante FS56 Stealth Fast Attack Craft is a patrol boat developed by the French Constructions Mécaniques de Normandie shipyard (CMN) as a development of  Combattante III class.

Three boats have been ordered for the Lebanese Navy, being paid for by Saudi Arabia. The vessels are to be armed with the Simbad air-defence systems and 20 mm Narwhal guns.

In January 2018, it was reported that Saudi Arabia could claim the vessels for its own navy after relations with Lebanon cooled the year before.

See also 
 La Combattante IIIb-class fast attack craft

References

External links 
 Combattante FS56, page on CMN Group website.
 Lebanese armed forces to purchase French VBC 90 armoured and CAESAR 155mm howitzers, Army Recognition
 CMN Combattante FS56 Stealth Fast Attack Craft Missile - CGI rendering of the boat and its weapon systems, YouTube
 Combattante FS56 Stealth Fast Attack Craft Missile specifications and technical data at Navy Recognition.

Missile boat classes